is a railway station in the town of Yokohama, Kamikita District, Aomori Prefecture, Japan, operated by East Japan Railway Company (JR East).

Lines
Mutsu-Yokohama Station is served by the Ōminato Line, and is located 30.1 kilometers from the official starting point of the line at Noheji Station.

Station layout
The station has a single island platform serving two tracks, with a small spur line for trains to be taken off the main rails for maintenance. The small station building has lacked a station master since budgetary restrictions in December 1999.

Platforms

History
Mutsu-Yokohama Station was opened on March 20, 1921 as a station on the Japanese Government Railways (JGR). All freight operations were discontinued as of March 15, 1973. With the privatization of the Japanese National Railways (JNR) on April 1, 1987, it came under the operational control of JR East.

Surrounding area
Yokohama Town Hall
Yokohama Post Office

Passenger statistics
In fiscal 2018, the station was used by an average of 70 passengers daily (boarding passengers only).

See also
 List of Railway Stations in Japan

References

External links

  

Railway stations in Aomori Prefecture
Railway stations in Japan opened in 1921
Ōminato Line
Yokohama, Aomori